Newport railway station is the junction for the Werribee and Williamstown lines in Victoria, Australia. It serves the western Melbourne suburb of Newport, and opened on 1 March 1859 as Geelong Junction. It was renamed Williamstown Junction in January 1869, and renamed Newport on 1 November 1881.

Two sidings exist at the northern (up) end of the station, used for the stabling of trains that operate the Williamstown and Altona line shuttle services. The Western standard gauge line to Adelaide operates to the west of the station, behind Platform 1, and the Newport Workshops are located to the south.

History
Newport station opened on 1 March 1859. Two years earlier, in 1857, the Geelong and Melbourne Railway Company opened its line to Newport from Geelong but, because the line from Melbourne to Newport was not yet complete, a track was constructed along North Road to a temporary terminus on the bank of the Yarra River at Greenwich, from where passengers were conveyed to Melbourne by ferry. In October of that year, the line towards Williamstown was opened and the Geelong line was connected to it.

In 1887, a line from Sunshine to Newport was opened, to allow easier access to the port of Williamstown for trains from the north of Victoria. A number of sidings were also provided in the Newport area: to a flour mill on the Melbourne side, and a goods yard on the western side of the Williamstown line.

In October 1960, the Melbourne Road level crossing, which was located just south of the station, was grade separated and replaced with the current overpass. In 1966, the stabling sidings to the north of the station were provided. On 22 July 1967, a freight line was provided to the west of Platform 1, so that freight trains could bypass the station itself. In 1995, that line was converted to dual gauge, and became part of the Western standard gauge line to Adelaide.

On 18 July 1996, Newport was upgraded to a Premium Station.

There have been several calls to build a Melbourne Metro 2 line, once the Melbourne Metro Rail Tunnel has been completed. Melbourne Metro 2 would run from Newport to Clifton Hill via Southern Cross. The project, designed to serve the Fishermans Bend development, as well as add capacity to the Mernda and Werribee lines, would bring considerable change to Newport, perhaps adding underground platforms. There have also been suggestions to route Geelong line services via Newport into Southern Cross once again, given the crowding at Wyndham Vale and Tarneit, as well as the lack of capacity on the Regional Rail Link set of tracks between Sunshine and the city.

Announced as part of a $57.7 million package in the 2022/23 Victorian State Budget, Newport, alongside other stations, will receive accessibility upgrades and improvements. The development process will begin in late 2022, with a timeline for the upgrades to be released once construction has begun.

On the Altona loop line, demolished station Mobiltown was located between Newport and Seaholme. On the direct route to Werribee, disused station Paisley and demolished station Galvin were located between Newport and Laverton.

Platforms and services
Newport has two side platforms. Platform 1 features a large brick building which houses an enclosed waiting area and toilets. Platform 2 has a smaller brick building which also contains toilets.

It is served by Werribee and Williamstown line trains.

Platform 1:
  all station and limited express services to Flinders Street and Frankston
  all stations services to Flinders Street and Frankston

Platform 2:
  all stations and limited express services to Werribee; all stations services to Laverton via Altona (weekdays only)
  all stations services to Williamstown

Until the opening of the Regional Rail Link in June 2015, Geelong and Warrnambool line services stopped at Newport.

Transport links

Transit Systems Victoria operates four routes via Newport station, under contract to Public Transport Victoria:
 : to Yarraville station
 : Williamstown – Sunshine station
 : Williamstown – Moonee Ponds Junction
  : to Footscray station (Saturday and Sunday mornings only)

References

External links
 Melway map at street-directory.com.au

Former rail freight terminals in Victoria (Australia)
Premium Melbourne railway stations
Railway stations in Melbourne
Railway stations in Australia opened in 1859
Railway stations in the City of Hobsons Bay